John Benedick  is an Indian professional footballer who plays as a defender for Students Union in the Bangalore Super Division.

Career
Born in Bangalore, Karnataka, Benedick started his footballing career at the age of seven. He started out playing as a striker until his coach, Andrew, converted Benedick to a defender. After participating in a few school tournaments Benedick joined Andrew's club, Southern Blues. After some good displays with Southern Blues, Benedick was selected to join the Karnataka U16 football team and eventually local club side CIL. Benedick then joined Bharat Electronics Limited in 2005.

Mumbai
After impressive displays with the Karnataka U21 side Benedick was selected for a trial with soon-to-be I-League 2nd Division side Mumbai. After the trials, Benedick signed with Mumbai. In his five seasons in Mumbai, Benedick was a regular starter for the club in both the I-League 2nd Division and the I-League.

Pune
In 2011 Benedick signed for Mumbai I-League rivals, Pune. Due to injury, Benedick missed the entirety of the 2011–12 season. After two seasons, Benedick was released by Pune.

After Pune
After leaving Pune, Benedick joined Bangalore Super Division side HAL before signing for another Super Division club, Students Union.

References

Living people
Footballers from Bangalore
Indian footballers
Mumbai FC players
Pune FC players
Hindustan Aeronautics Limited S.C. players
Association football defenders
I-League players
I-League 2nd Division players
Year of birth missing (living people)